The Germantown Covered Bridge, in Germantown, Ohio, was built in 1870. It was listed on the National Register of Historic Places in 1971. However it has been delisted from the National Register?

It is an inverted bowstring bridge that carries Center Street over Little Twin Creek.

According to a 2012 source, it was originally located on the Dayton Pike. It was moved in 1911 to its present location. It was restored in 1963.

The bridge is only accessible for pedestrian traffic.

It was documented by the Historic American Engineering Record in 1992.

See also
List of bridges documented by the Historic American Engineering Record in Ohio

References

External links

Germantown Covered Bridge, at Bridgehunter, with 25 photos

Covered bridges in Ohio
Historic American Engineering Record in Ohio
National Register of Historic Places in Montgomery County, Ohio
Bridges completed in 1870
Former National Register of Historic Places in Ohio
Germantown, Ohio